The 2018–19 SPHL season is the 15th season of the Southern Professional Hockey League (SPHL).

League business
After eleven seasons, president Jim Combs left the league to pursue other opportunities. He originally joined the league in the 2007–08 season and had been league president since 2010–11. Combs was replaced by Doug Price on January 17, 2019.

Team changes
The Quad City Storm from Moline, Illinois, joined the SPHL by acquiring the dormant Louisiana IceGators franchise. The Storm replaced the folded Quad City Mallards of the ECHL in the Quad Cities.
The Mississippi RiverKings ownership suspended operations while the league seeks to find new ownership.

Regular season

Standings
Final standings:

‡ William B. Coffey Trophy winners
 Advanced to playoffs

President's Cup playoffs
For 2019, the top eight teams at the end of the regular season qualify for the playoffs. The league kept the format implemented in the previous season where the top three seeds choose their opponent from the bottom four qualifiers, calling it the "challenge round". The second round will still have the highest versus lowest remaining seed format.

Playoff bracket

Awards

All-SPHL selections

References

External links
Southern Professional Hockey League website

Southern Professional Hockey League seasons
Sphl